WYKY (106.1 FM) is a commercial adult contemporary radio station serving Somerset, Kentucky and licensed to Science Hill. The station is owned by Forcht Broadcasting, a division of Forcht Group of Kentucky, as part of a duopoly with adult standards station WTLO (1480 AM). WYKY and WTLO share studios along WTLO Road west of Somerset, while its transmitter facilities are located atop a hill between Somerset and Shopville.

History
WYKY went on the air on October 17, 2008. The station was built and signed on by Forcht Broadcasting. The station began with live local radio personalities in the morning and afternoon timeslots.

Programming
WYKY principally broadcasts an adult contemporary radio format. Local programming consists of a weekday morning show under the title The Morning Mix, interrupted by a half-hour lifestyle program Mid-Mornings with Amy. The station also serves as the local broadcaster of high school sports from Somerset High School. WYKY, along with its sister WTLO, offer national and international news updates from CBS News Radio.

References

External links
WYKY's official website

Pulaski County, Kentucky
YKY